This is a list of communities in Nunavut, Canada. Note that many of these communities have alternate names or spellings in Inuktitut or Inuinnaqtun, while others are primarily known by their Inuktitut or Inuinnaqtun names. As of the 2016 census the population of Nunavut was 35,944, an increase of 12.66% from the 2011 census.

Communities 
The following are communities recognised by the Government of Nunavut.

Former communities 

 Amadjuak, on Baffin Island
 Brooman Point Village, on Bathurst Island
 Craig Harbour, on Ellesmere Island
 Dundas Harbour, on Devon Island
 Iglunga, on an island off Baffin Island
 Killiniq (Port Burwell), on Killiniq Island
 Native Point, on the peninsula of the same name
 Nuwata, on Baffin Island
 Padlei, on the mainland
 Port Leopold, on Somerset Island
 Tavani, on the mainland

Hudson's Bay Company trading posts

 Amadjuak
 Apex
 Arctic Bay
 Baker Lake
 Bathurst Inlet
 Bay Chimo (Umingmaktok)
 Belcher Islands
 Blacklead Island
 Cambridge Bay
 Cape Dorset
 Charlton Island Depot
 Chesterfield Inlet
 Clyde River
 Coats Island
 Dundas Harbour
 Eskimo Point (Arviat)
 Fort Hearne
 Fort Ross
 Frobisher Bay (Iqaluit)
 Gjoa Haven
 Igloolik
 Kent Peninsula
 King William Island
 Kugaryuak
 Lake Harbour (Kimmirut)
 Mansel Island
 Nueltin House
 Padley (Padlei)
 Pangnirtung
 Pangnirtung Fox Farm
 Perry River
 Ponds Inlet
 Port Leopold
 Port Burwell (Killiniq)
 Repulse Bay
 Southampton Island
 Tavane (Tavani)
 Tree River
 Wager Inlet (Wager Bay)

Notes

iglu meaning house and refers to the sod houses that were originally in the area.
Part of the Hope Bay greenstone belt and are operated by Newmont Mining Corporation
Neither Bathurst Inlet, Nanisivik or Umingmaktok are listed as an official community by the Government of Nunavut, but are listed as settlements by Statistics Canada.

References

External links
Communities of Nunavut Poster (Canada-Nunavut Geoscience Office) (free for download with a map)
Nunavut communities at Nunavut Tourism
Interactive map at Nunavut Tourism

 
Communities